Raja Bazar or Rajabazar may refer to:

Rajabazar, Kolkata, a locality in the city of Kolkata in West Bengal, India
Rajabazar Science College
Raja Bazaar, a locality in the city of Rawalpindi in Punjab, Pakistan
East Raja Bazar, a mahalla (neighborhood) in the city of Dhaka, Bangladesh
West Raja Bazar, a mahalla (neighborhood) in the city of Dhaka, Bangladesh